MS Viking Glory is a cruiseferry owned and operated by Viking Line. The ship was launched in January 2021 and entered service in March 2022. Viking Glory was built at the Xiamen Shipbuilding Industry shipyard in China. The order was worth 225 million euro. The ship operates the Turku-Åland-Stockholm route, where she replaced the Amorella. 

Viking Glory was built on the foundation of Viking Grace, but her energy efficiency was sought to improve. The ship is slightly longer and wider than Viking Grace, making her nine percent larger.

Construction
The ship was ordered on April 5, 2017 and construction was started in China on September 3, 2018. The keel was landed on June 3, 2019. Nordic companion companies of the ship construction include Wärtsilä, Kone, Deltamarin and Almaco. The ship was launched on January 26, 2021. Viking Glory's first cruise was on March 1, 2022.

Naming contest
In spring 2019 a naming contest was held for the ship, where the public could suggest a name for the new ship. Viking Line picked ten finalists from the suggestions, where the public could vote for their favourite. The name of the ship was published on May 27, 2019.

References

External links
 Site about the ship under construction

Cruiseferries
Ferries of Finland
Ferries of Sweden
Ships built in China
2021 ships